Upney is a London Underground station located on Upney Lane in Barking, east London. It is on the District line between  station to the west and  station to the east. It is in London fare zone 4.

The station was opened in 1932 by the London, Midland and Scottish Railway on the local electrified tracks that were extended to Upminster from Barking.

History
Upney was a village which lost its identity when it was swallowed up by the town of Barking. It apparently lost that identity after the station opened, as it was shown on an Ordnance Survey map fully revised in 1932, when the area was less built-up than it is today.

The station was opened in 1932 when the electrified District line was extended to Upminster from Barking. The station was constructed and initially operated by the London, Midland and Scottish Railway with services provided by the District line from the outset.

Design
The station buildings are of typical 1930s design and the platforms are arranged on a central island with a sloping walkway connection to the ticket hall.

Services
Typical off-peak service from the station is:
12 tph (trains per hour) east to Upminster
6 tph west to Ealing Broadway
6 tph west to Richmond

Connections
London Buses route 62 serves the station.

References

External links

 Loxford Chase

District line stations
Former London, Midland and Scottish Railway stations
Railway stations in Great Britain opened in 1932
Tube stations in the London Borough of Barking and Dagenham